Chad Szeliga (born December 11, 1976) is an American drummer from Elyria, Ohio. Formerly the drummer of rock band Breaking Benjamin, he joined Black Label Society in 2013, replacing Mike Froedge. In 2017, Szeliga replaced Jimmy DeGrasso in Black Star Riders, leaving the band in 2021. Szeliga looks up to Vinnie Colaiuta, John Bonham, Steve Gadd, Dennis Chambers, Tony Williams, Manu Katche, Stewart Copeland and Neil Peart as his main influences.

Career

Breaking Benjamin 
While with Another Path, Szeliga recorded an audition video for Breaking Benjamin playing drums for the song "So Cold". The video submitted happened to be the only VHS tape submitted. Ben Burnley was forced to borrow a VCR from his neighbor to view the tape. After Burnley reviewed the tape, the band decided he was the right guy for the job. His first official recording with the band was for the full-band version of the song "Rain" from We Are Not Alone in mid-2005, which was sent to modern radio, and later appeared on the band's cover of Queen's "Who Wants to Live Forever". He recorded with Breaking Benjamin on their 2006 album Phobia, which was released August 8, 2006. He also joined the band on their tour supporting that album.

Szeliga left Breaking Benjamin in April 2013 due to creative differences with Frontman Ben Burnley and notified his fans via a Facebook post on April 22, 2013.

Other ventures 
He went on to drum with Black Label Society until 2014 and also recorded and toured briefly with Creed front man Scott Stapp.

On May 5, 2017, Szeliga was announced as the new drummer for Black Star Riders, replacing Jimmy DeGrasso.

In 2018, Szeliga announced the start of a new project, Walking with Lions, in collaboration with guitarist Kevin Hicklin of 3 By Design.  In 2020, it was announced that Szeliga had joined rock act Weapons of Anew sometime after the release of their debut album, replacing Chris Manfre.

Equipment 

As of July 2020, Szeliga endorses Tama Drums, Evans drumheads, Paiste cymbals, and Vater Percussion drumsticks. He largely uses the Starclassic Performer Bubinga series as well as the new line of Tama's S.L.P Dymanic Kapur kit and has a tendency to put the mid rack tom to the left of his kit preceding the high rack tom, claiming that it encourages him to be more creative with his fills. His previous endorsements were Yamaha Drums, DW Drums, Vic Firth drumsticks Remo drumheads and  Zildjian cymbals.

Drums: Tama Starclassic Performer Bubinga in blue nebula blaze:
 22"x18" bass drum
 8"x6" rack tom
 10"x6.5" rack tom
 12"x7" rack tom
 14"x12" floor tom
 16"x14" floor tom
 13"x7" starphonic steel snare.

Cymbals: Paiste:
 RUDE 14" hi-hats
 Formula 602 Modern Essentials 10" splash
 2002 5.5" cup chime
 Masters 17" dark crash
 Masters 18" dark crash
 Signature 6" splash
 Signature Dark Energy 8" mark 1 splash
 RUDE 20" mega bell ride (custom made in purple colorsound finish)
 PST X 14" swiss flanger stack
 Formula 602 Modern Essentials 19" crash
 2002 19" wild china.

Cymbals circa 2019:
 RUDE 14" hi-hats
 Signature Dark Energy 8" mark l splash
 Signature 6" splash
 Signature Dark Energy 17" mark l crash
 Signature Dark Energy 18" mark l crash
 2002 5.5" cup chime
 2002 6" cup chime
 Signature 22" blue bell ride
 PST X 14" swiss flanger stack
 Signature Dark Energy 19" mark l crash
 Masters 22" swish.

Discography 

With Breaking Benjamin
 We Are Not Alone (full-band version of "Rain" only) (2004)
 Phobia (2006)
 Dear Agony (2009)

With Black Label Society
 Catacombs of the Black Vatican (2014)

With Switched
 Subject to Change (2002)
 Ghosts in the Machine (2006)

With Forever Oeuvre
 EP Unfinished (2008)

With Casey Honig
 Tragic Uprise EP (2016)

With Black Star Riders
 Another State of Grace (2019)

References 

1976 births
Alternative rock drummers
American alternative rock musicians
American heavy metal drummers
Breaking Benjamin members
Living people
Musicians from Ohio
Musicians from Pennsylvania
People from Elyria, Ohio
People from Wilkes-Barre, Pennsylvania
20th-century American drummers
American male drummers
Black Label Society members
Switched (band) members
Black Star Riders members
21st-century American drummers